Relations between France and Angola have not always been cordial, due to the former French government's policy of supporting militant separatists in Angola's Cabinda Province. The international Angolagate scandal embarrassed both governments, by exposing corruption and illicit arms deals. Following French President Nicolas Sarkozy's visit in 2008, relations have improved.

History
Agostinho Neto, the leader of the People's Movement for the Liberation of Angola (MPLA), declared the independence of the People's Republic of Angola on November 11, 1975, in accordance with the Alvor Accords. National Union for the Total Independence of Angola (UNITA) and the National Liberation Front of Angola (FNLA) also declared Angolan independence as the Social Democratic Republic of Angola based in Huambo and the Democratic Republic of Angola based in Ambriz. The Front for the Liberation of the Enclave of Cabinda (FLEC), armed and backed by the French government, declared the independence of the Republic of Cabinda in Paris.

Diplomatic missions

Francis Blondet was the ambassador of France to Angola. 
The current French ambassador is Sylvain Itté. Angola maintains an embassy in Paris and France maintains an embassy in Luanda.

State visits
President José Eduardo dos Santos traveled to France, Italy, and Spain, meeting with politicians and business leaders in September 1984.

In 1998, President Jacques Chirac visited Angola.

French President Sarkozy visited Angola in May 2008. During this visit, Sarkozy said his aim in meeting his Angolan counterpart, President dos Santos, was "to turn the page from the misunderstandings of the past and build a future based on trust and mutual respect".

During this visit, Sarkozy announced greatly increased French assistance to Angola:
France wishes to play a full part in the rebuilding of Angola in every sphere, in infrastructure as well as in human resources. As regards infrastructure, we have already decided to resume the activities of the French Development Agency (AFD) which will fund major projects in the fields of energy, water, sanitation, and also in vocational training. An AFD agency will reopen in Luanda before the end of 2008.

Agreements
During Sarkozy's 2008 visit, four cooperation and development accords were signed in the areas of health, sanitation, higher education and French language instruction.

Trade and investment
In 2008, French defence and security company Thales won a contract worth approximately 140 million EUR   to supply a secure telecommunications network for the Angolan government. Also in 2008, French bank Société Générale opened US$300 million of credit lines to finance trade between the two countries.

In 2007, France imported €541 million worth of goods to Angola which meant that France was Angola's 6th highest importer.

In 2016, trade between France and Angola was worth US$1.31 billion. French exports to Angola amounted to US$284.2 million and Angolan exports to France amounted to US$1.03 billion

Education
Lycée Français de Luanda is a French international school in Luanda.

Migration

French Angolans

French Angolans are Angolans with French ancestry or French people who resided and/or live in Angola. They form one of the largest French diaspora communities in Africa, outside Françafrique.

See also
Angolan Civil War
Angolagate
Arcadi Gaydamak

References

External links
Embassy of France in Angola

 
France
Bilateral relations of France